Poecilus sericeus is a species of ground beetle native to the Palearctic (including Europe). In Europe, it is found in Austria, Croatia, the Czech Republic, mainland France, Germany, Hungary, Moldova, Poland, southern Russia, Slovakia, mainland Spain, Ukraine and Yugoslavia.

External links
Poecilus sericeus at Fauna Europaea

Pterostichinae
Beetles described in 1824